Graeme Tarr (20 November 1936 – 8 December 2020) was a New Zealand cricketer. He played in eight first-class matches for Northern Districts from 1957 to 1959.

See also
 List of Northern Districts representative cricketers

References

External links
 

1936 births
2020 deaths
New Zealand cricketers
Northern Districts cricketers
Cricketers from Hamilton, New Zealand